Groseclose may refer to:

Surnames
Elgin Groseclose, American economist
Timothy Groseclose, American political scientist and economist
Henry C. Groseclose, American professor and founder, National FFA Organization

Places
Groseclose, Smyth County, Virginia, United States
Groseclose, Wythe County, Virginia, United States